Mazer Ab Anari (also Romanized as Māzer Āb Ānārī) is a village in Lalar and Katak Rural District, Chelo District, Andika County, Khuzestan Province, Iran. At the 2006 census, its population was 150, in 25 families.

References 

Populated places in Andika County